Fergus O'Dowd (born 1 September 1948) is an Irish Fine Gael politician who has been a Teachta Dála (TD) for the Louth constituency since the 2002 general election. He was appointed Chair of the Committee on the Implementation of the Good Friday Agreement in September 2020. He previously served as Chair of the Committee on Transport, Tourism and Sport from 2017 to 2020 and as a Minister of State from 2011 to 2014.

Early life 
O'Dowd was born in Thurles, County Tipperary, in 1948. He was educated by the Christian Brothers in Drogheda, County Louth.

Political career 
He was first elected to Drogheda Town Council in 1974 as a member of the Labour Party, and was elected to Louth County Council in 1979, serving on the county council until 2003. He contested the 1977 general election as a Labour Party candidate, but was not elected. In 1982, O'Dowd left the Labour Party and joined Fine Gael. He served three terms as Chairman of Drogheda Town Council: 1977–78, 1981–82 and 1994–95.

A teacher before entering politics, O'Dowd was elected to Seanad Éireann as a Senator for the Administrative Panel in 1997. He was first elected to Dáil Éireann at the 2002 general election, on his fourth attempt. He was immediately appointed Fine Gael spokesperson for Community, Rural and Gaeltacht Affairs. He was party Spokesperson on Environment, Heritage and Local Government from 2004 to 2007, and on Transport and Marine from 2007 to 2010. In June 2010, he supported Richard Bruton's leadership challenge to Enda Kenny. Following Kenny's victory in a motion of confidence, O'Dowd was appointed as party Spokesperson on Education and Skills.

On 10 March 2011, he was appointed as Minister of State at the Department of Environment, Community and Local Government and at the Department of Communications, Energy and Natural Resources with special responsibility for the NewEra Project. He was dropped as a Minister of State in a reshuffle in July 2014.

Personal life 
O'Dowd lives in Drogheda and is married to Agnes O'Dowd; they have three sons. He is a brother of Niall O'Dowd, publisher of the Irish Voice newspaper in New York City. Another brother, Michael O'Dowd, stood against him for Renua at the 2016 general election.

References

External links
Fergus O'Dowd's page on the Fine Gael website

 

1948 births
Living people
Fine Gael TDs
Irish schoolteachers
Local councillors in County Louth
Members of the 21st Seanad
Members of the 29th Dáil
Members of the 30th Dáil
Members of the 31st Dáil
Members of the 32nd Dáil
Members of the 33rd Dáil
Ministers of State of the 31st Dáil
People from Thurles
Politicians from County Louth
Politicians from County Tipperary
Fine Gael senators
Alumni of Maynooth University